The Earl Building is a historic commercial building at 201 North St. Joseph Street in Morrilton, Arkansas.  It is a single-story frame structure, with brick walls and a flat roof.  It is roughly L-shaped, with one wing originally serving as an automotive showroom and the other as a service and supply area.  It was built in 1926 and enlarged a few years later, and is a well-preserved example of a 1920s automotive dealership building.

The building was listed on the National Register of Historic Places in 2009.

See also
National Register of Historic Places listings in Conway County, Arkansas

References

Commercial buildings on the National Register of Historic Places in Arkansas
National Register of Historic Places in Conway County, Arkansas
Commercial buildings completed in 1926
Buildings and structures in Morrilton, Arkansas
1926 establishments in Arkansas